DMCC  may refer to:
Diplomats and Military Commanders for Change
Dubai Multi Commodities Centre
Diploma in the Medical Care of Catastrophes (DMCC), a diploma run by the Worshipful Society of Apothecaries based in London